Made Again is a 1996 double live album by Marillion, their first live recording with singer Steve Hogarth. The first disc contains material recorded in London on the Holidays in Eden tour (1991) and in Rotterdam on the Afraid of Sunlight tour (1995); the second disc consists of a full live version of the album Brave recorded in Paris in 1994.   Outside of the UK, distribution would be handled by the then independent record label Castle Communications, who would also release the band's next three studio albums.

Background 
Made Agains format echoes that of the previous live album The Thieving Magpie (1988), which also documented a four studio-album period, contained a complete concept album on one disc (in that case, Misplaced Childhood), and marked the end of an era (Fish's departure). Made Again, in turn, was the final album Marillion released under their then-current contract with EMI Records.

 Reissues 
The album has been reissued by Castle Communications in 2001 and by Sanctuary Records in 2006. In addition, all the full concerts from London, Paris, and Rotterdam have been remixed by Mike Hunter and included on the book-set reissues of Holidays in Eden, Brave and Afraid of Sunlight.

 Track listing 
Disc 1
 "Splintering Heart" – 6:33
 "Easter" – 6:23
 "No One Can" – 4:44
 "Waiting to Happen" – 5:07
 "Cover My Eyes" – 4:05
 "The Space" – 6:34
"Hooks In You" – 3:01
 "Beautiful" – 5:37
 "Kayleigh" – 4:00
 "Lavender" – 4:18
 "Afraid of Sunlight" – 6:54
 "King" – 7:25

Taken from the albums:
 Misplaced Childhood (1985) - tracks 9, 10;
 Seasons End (1989) – tracks 2, 6, 7;
 Holidays in Eden (1991) - tracks 1, 3, 4, 5;
 Afraid of Sunlight (1995) - tracks 8, 11, 12.
Recorded at:
 Hammersmith Odeon, London, 29 September 1991 - tracks 1-6;
 Ahoy, Rotterdam, 29 September 1995 - tracks 7-12.

Disc 2
A complete performance of the album Brave (1994), recorded at La Cigale, Paris, 29 April 1994.

 "Bridge" – 3:25
 "Living with the Big Lie" – 6:47
 "Runaway" – 4:45
 "Goodbye to All That" – 0:40
 "Wave" – 1:21
 "Mad" – 1:23
 "The Opium Den" – 2:37
 "The Slide" – 4:09
 "Standing in the Swing" – 2:11
 "Hard As Love" – 6:57
 "Hollow Man" – 4:32
 "Alone Again in the Lap of Luxury" – 6:43
 "Now Wash Your Hands" – 1:14
 "Paper Lies" – 5:33
 "Brave" – 8:38
 "The Great Escape" – 1:17
 "The Last of You" – 2:41
 "Falling from the Moon" – 3:27
 "Made Again" – 5:24

 Personnel 
 Steve Hogarth – vocals
 Steve Rothery – guitars
 Mark Kelly – keyboards
 Pete Trewavas – bass
 Ian Mosley – drums

 Charts Album'

References 

1996 live albums
Marillion live albums